Nogometni klub Bravo (English: Bravo Football Club), commonly referred simply as Bravo, is a Slovenian football club from Ljubljana, which plays in the Slovenian PrvaLiga. The club was founded in 2006.

Current squad
As of 23 February 2023

Honours
League
Slovenian Second League
 Winners: 2018–19

Slovenian Third League
 Winners: 2016–17

Ljubljana Regional League (fourth tier)
 Winners: 2014–15

MNZ Ljubljana League (fifth tier)
 Winners: 2013–14

Cup
Slovenian Cup
 Runners-up: 2021–22

MNZ Ljubljana Cup
 Winners: 2017–18

References

External links
Official website 

 
Association football clubs established in 2006
Football clubs in Ljubljana
2006 establishments in Slovenia